Lesbian was a  cargo liner which was built by Thomas Royden & Sons Ltd., Liverpool. She was launched in 1874 and scrapped in 1903.

History
Lesbian was built in 1874 by Thomas Royden & Sons Ltd, Liverpool as yard number 162. Launched in July 1874, she was built for F R Leyland and Co. In July 1878, the steamship  suffered a broken propeller shaft. Sicilian was towed in to Gibraltar on 3 July by Lesbian. In February 1888, Lesbian ran aground at "Bulgar", Ottoman Empire whilst on a voyage from Constantinople to Liverpool. She served with the Leyland Line until 1901, when she was sold to Ellerman Lines Ltd. She was renamed Algeria and served for a further two years. Algeria was scrapped at Livorno, Italy in 1903.

Official number and code letters
Official Numbers were a forerunner to IMO Numbers.

Lesbian had the UK Official Number 70850.

References

Ships built on the River Mersey
Merchant ships of the United Kingdom
Steamships
1874 ships
Ships of the Ellerman Lines
Cargo liners
Maritime incidents in February 1888